Anatoly Nikolayevich Alexandrov (Moscow – April 16, 1982, Moscow) was a Soviet and Russian composer of works for piano and for other instruments, and pianist. His initial works had a mystical element, but he downplayed this to better fit socialist realism. He led a somewhat retiring life, but received several honors.

Alexandrov was the son of a Professor of Tomsk State University. He attended the Moscow Conservatory (which he left in 1915), where he was a pupil of Nikolai Zhilyayev, Sergei Taneyev and Sergei Vasilenko (theory), Alexander Ilyinsky (composition) and Konstantin Igumnov (pianoforte). His early music revealed the influence of Nikolai Medtner and Alexander Scriabin. He was appointed Professor at the Moscow Conservatory in 1923. Viktor Belyaev, Alexandrov's first biographer, wrote in 1926: "If Myaskovsky is a thinker, and Feinberg a psychologist, then Alexandrov is, before anything else, a poet." Alexandrov was also a strong proponent of Stanchinsky and edited much of his compositions for publication.

Works

For orchestra
Symphony No. 1 in C, Op. 92 (1965)
Symphony No. 2 in B-flat, Op. 109 (1977/78)
Piano concerto, Op. 102 (1974)
Overture on Russian folksongs, Op. 29 (1915, rev. 1930)
Overture on two Russian folksongs, Op. 65 (1948)
Stage and Film music

Vocal music
Two Worlds, opera (1916)
The Forty-first, opera, Op. 41 (1933–35, unfinished)
Béla, opera, Op. 51 (1940–45)
Die wilde Bara, opera, Op. 82 (1954–57)
Lewscha, r opera, Op. 103 (1975)
 many songs for voice and piano
R

Chamber music
String Quartet No. 1 in G, Op. 7(1914, rev. 1921)
String Quartet No. 2 in C-sharp minor, Op. 54 (1942)
String Quartet No. 3, Op. 55 (1942)
String Quartet No. 4 in C major, Op. 80 (1953)
Cello Sonata in G major, Op. 112 (1981/82)

Piano sonatas
Sonata No. 1 in F-sharp minor, Op. 4. "Märchensonate" (1914)
Sonata No. 2 in D minor, Op. 12 (1918)
Sonata No. 3 in F-sharp minor, Op. 18 (1920, rev. 1956 und 1967)
Sonata No. 4 in C, Op. 19 (1922, rev. 1954)
Sonata No. 5 in G-sharp minor, Op. 22 (1923, rev. 1938)
Sonata No. 6 in G, Op. 26 (1925)
Sonata No. 7 in D, Op. 42 (1932)
Sonata No. 8 in B-flat, Op. 50 (1939–44)
Sonata No. 9 in C minor, Op. 61 (1945)
Sonata No. 10 in F, Op. 72 (1951)
Sonata No. 11 in C, Op. 81 "Sonate-Fantasie" (1955)
Sonata No. 12 in B minor, Op. 87 (1962)
Sonata No. 13 in F-sharp minor, Op. 90 "Märchensonate" (1964)
Sonata No. 14 in E, Op. 97 (1971)

Other piano works
6 Preludes, Op. 1 (revised by the composer, 1961)
2 Pieces, Op. 3 (revised by the composer, 1919)
"Obsession passée", 4 Fragments, Op. 6 (1911–17)
Poem, op. 9 (1915)
4 Preludes, Op. 10 (1916)
Two Fragments from the Music to the Drama by M. Maeterlinck "Ariana and Blue-Beard", op. 16a
Visions, 5 pieces, op. 21 (1919-1923)
Three Pieces, op. 27 (1927)
3 Etudes, Op. 31
Little Suite No. 1, Op. 33 (1929)
"Eight Pieces after themes from Songs of the People of the USSR", Op. 46 (1937)
4 Narratives, Op. 48 (1939)
Ballad, Op. 49 (1939)
Suite Fantasia after opera "Bela", three pieces, op. 51b
Echoes of the Theatre, six pieces, op. 60
Four Miniature Pictures, op. 66 (1937)
Bashkirian Melodies, 9 pieces, op. 73 (1950)
Four Pieces, op. 75 (1951)
Russian Folk Melodies, volume 2, 10 pieces, op. 76 (1951)
Little Suite No. 2, Op. 78 (1952)
"Romantic Episodes", 10 pieces, Op. 88 (1962)
Elegy and Waltz, Op. 89 (1964)
Four Pieces from Incidental Music for Films, op. 92 (1967)
Pages From A Diary, Book 1, ten pieces, op. 94 (1967)
Pages From A Diary, Book 2, ten pieces, op. 95 (1967-1968)
Three Fugues, op. 100 (1973)
Little Suite No. 3, Op. 102 (1973)
"My Soul -- Elysium of Visions", 5 pieces, Op. 110 (1979)
"Visions", 2 pieces, Op. 111 (1979, unfinished)

Instrumental music
Suite for Wind Quartet (Flute, Oboe, Clarinet, Bassoon)

References

1888 births
1982 deaths
20th-century pianists
20th-century Russian male musicians
Musicians from Moscow
People's Artists of the RSFSR
People's Artists of the USSR
Stalin Prize winners
Recipients of the Order of Friendship of Peoples
Recipients of the Order of Lenin
Recipients of the Order of the Red Banner of Labour
Male pianists
Russian composers
Russian film score composers
Russian male composers
Russian military personnel of World War I
Russian music educators
Russian opera composers
Russian pianists
Soviet composers
Soviet film score composers
Soviet male composers
Soviet military personnel of the Russian Civil War
Soviet music educators
Soviet opera composers
Soviet pianists
Burials at Vvedenskoye Cemetery